Pamela Y. Duncan (born September 24, 1961) is an American novelist.  Her novels include Moon Women (2001), Plant Life (2003), and The Big Beautiful (2007).  Her awards include the Sir Walter Raleigh Prize in 2003, and in 2000 she was chosen as one of the Ten Best Emerging Writers in the South. She won an American Library Association award in 2007.  Her work often focuses on the lives of working class Southerners.

She was born in Asheville, North Carolina, and raised in Black Mountain, North Carolina, and Shelby, North Carolina. She has a bachelor's degree in English from the University of North Carolina at Chapel Hill and master's degree from North Carolina State University. Duncan currently teaches creative writing at Western Carolina University.

Reviews

Moon Women
 "... a mesmerizing tale of family and love, revelation and forgiveness."
 "... delightfully captures the lives of four North Carolina women and their relationships with each other."

References

1961 births
Living people
Writers from Asheville, North Carolina
21st-century American novelists
People from Shelby, North Carolina
University of North Carolina at Chapel Hill alumni
American women novelists
21st-century American women writers